In topology, the Tychonoff plank is a topological space defined using ordinal spaces that is a counterexample to several plausible-sounding conjectures. The deleted Tychonoff plank is obtained by deleting the point .

Properties
The Tychonoff plank is a compact Hausdorff space and is therefore a normal space. However, the deleted Tychonoff plank is non-normal. Therefore the Tychonoff plank is not completely normal. This shows that a subspace of a normal space need not be normal.  The Tychonoff plank is not perfectly normal because it is not a Gδ space: the singleton  is closed but not a Gδ set.

The Stone–Čech compactification of the deleted Tychonoff plank is the Tychonoff plank.

Notes

See also 

 List of topologies

References

External links 

Topological spaces